Friedrich Franz, (1 December 1783 – 4 December 1860) was a professor of physics and applied mathematics at the Faculty of Philosophy of University of Olomouc, who greatly influenced his student Gregor Johann Mendel, later known as "The Father of Genetics".

Biography
Friedrich Franz graduated in 1831 the University of Prague as Doctor of Philosophy and Liberal Arts. Before he came in 1842 to Olomouc, he taught physics at a philosophical institute (type of grammar school) in Brno (Brünn).

Franz was the first lecturer on the daguerreotype process in Moravia. He started experimenting already in 1839, the same year that Louis Daguerre developed this method of taking photographs.

He also arranged exhibitions. The fact that this photographic process took roots in Moravia is attributable to him. Franz is believed to be the author of photography of "Corpus Christi" taken in Brno on 10 June 1841, which is the first reportage photography in the Czech lands and one of the first photographies worldwide. He is also believed to be the author of the first portrait photos in the Czech lands. In 1841 he made photo portraits of Brno Bishop František Antonín Gindl.

In Olomouc, Gregor Johann Mendel was one of the most favourite Franz's students. Franz immediately recognized his great talent, and they soon became good friends. They debated a number of topics, such as the origin of the solar system and of life as such, the development of Goethe's philosophy and the purpose of human life. Franz also provided the newest scientific literature to Mendel and recommended him to enter the St Thomas's Abbey, where Mendel later defined his famous laws of inheritance.

In 1844 Franz became the dean of the Faculty of Philosophy. After the Austrian government dissolved the Olomouc Faculty of Philosophy following the students' and professors' participation on 1848 revolution, Franz became briefly the rector of the University in 1852, before he left and became a director of a grammar school in Salzburg, while later he was a Premonstratensian prelate in Nová Říše (Neureisch).

See also 
 Johann Karl Nestler

References

1783 births
1860 deaths
People from Vysoké Veselí
People from the Kingdom of Bohemia
German Bohemian people
Austrian geneticists
Austrian photographers
19th-century Austrian Roman Catholic priests
Academic staff of Palacký University Olomouc
Premonstratensians